Joseph Edward Lewis Buttleman (born 23 August 1987) is an English cricketer. Buttleman is a right-handed batsman who bowls right-arm fast-medium. He was born in Basildon, Essex and educated at Felsted School.

While studying for his degree at Durham University, Buttleman made his first-class debut for Durham UCCE against Durham in 2007. He made six further first-class appearances for the university, the last of which came against Warwickshire in 2009. In his seven first-class matches, he scored 156 runs at an average of 14.18, with a high score of 56 not out. This score, his only first-class fifty, came against Lancashire in 2008. With the ball, he took 10 wickets at a bowling average of 30.90, with best figures of 2/32.

References

External links
Joe Buttleman at ESPNcricinfo
Joe Buttleman at CricketArchive
The Blazer at Brentwood Cricket Club

1987 births
Living people
Sportspeople from Basildon
People educated at Felsted School
Alumni of Durham University
English cricketers
Durham MCCU cricketers